The 30th District of the Iowa Senate is located in northeast Iowa, and is currently composed of Black Hawk County.

Current elected officials
Eric Giddens is the senator currently representing the 30th District.

The area of the 30th District contains two Iowa House of Representatives districts:
The 59th District (represented by Bob Kressig)
The 60th District (represented by Dave Williams)

The district is also located in Iowa's 1st congressional district, which is represented by Ashley Hinson.

Past senators
The district has previously been represented by:

Charles Peter Miller, 1983–1988
Mark R. Hagerla, 1989–1992
Emil Husak, 1993–1996
Neal Schuerer, 1997–2002
Mary Kramer, 2003
Pat Ward, 2004–2012
Jeff Danielson, 2013–2019
Eric Giddens 2019–present

See also
Iowa General Assembly
Iowa Senate

References

30